Dawid Igor Kownacki (born 14 March 1997) is a Polish professional footballer who plays as a striker for  club Fortuna Düsseldorf and the Poland national team. Besides Poland, he has played in Italy and Germany.

Early career
Having started out at local side GKP Gorzów Wielkopolski, Kownacki joined Lech Poznań in 2005, coming through the youth ranks and making it to the first team in December 2013. He scored his first Ekstraklasa goal in February 2014 in a 5–1 loss at Pogoń Szczecin, becoming one of only five players aged under 17 to have registered in Poland's top flight. He won his first league title the following season – "At 16, people were calling me 'the new Lewandowski', and that was tough to handle, but I changed my attitude, grew up and am now much better at not taking to heart what people say. Of course, I still have big dreams".

Club career

Sampdoria
On 11 July 2017, Kownacki signed a five-year contract with Italian side Sampdoria.

In November, he scored a brace and assisted another goal in Sampdoria's 4–1 Coppa Italia win against Delfino Pescara in the fourth round.

Fortuna Düsseldorf
On 31 January 2019, Kownacki joined to German Bundesliga club Fortuna Düsseldorf on loan with an option to buy.

On 30 June 2019, he rejoined Fortuna on another loan with an obligation to buy, which was fulfilled in January 2020.

Loan to Lech
On 2 February 2022, Kownacki returned to his maiden club Lech Poznań on a straight loan until the end of the season.

International career
Kownacki represented Poland at under-16, under-17, under-19 and under-21 level, winning 46 caps and scoring 31 goals. He received his first call-up to the senior Poland squad for matches against Georgia and Greece in June 2015.

In May 2018, he was named in Poland's preliminary 35-man squad and subsequently final 23-man for the 2018 World Cup in Russia.

Career statistics

Club

1 Including Polish Super Cup.

International

International goals
As of match played on 12 June 2018. Scores and results list Poland's goal tally first.

Honours
Lech Poznań
 Ekstraklasa: 2014–15, 2021–22
 Polish Super Cup: 2015, 2016

References

External links

1997 births
Living people
Sportspeople from Gorzów Wielkopolski
Polish footballers
Poland youth international footballers
Poland under-21 international footballers
Poland international footballers
Association football forwards
Lech Poznań II players
Lech Poznań players
U.C. Sampdoria players
Fortuna Düsseldorf players
III liga players
Ekstraklasa players
Serie A players
Bundesliga players
2. Bundesliga players
2018 FIFA World Cup players
UEFA Euro 2020 players
Polish expatriate footballers
Expatriate footballers in Germany
Expatriate footballers in Italy
Polish expatriate sportspeople in Germany
Polish expatriate sportspeople in Italy